Richard Winer (May 14, 1925 – October 11, 2016) was an American author of books dealing mainly with mysteries and the paranormal.

Bermuda Triangle

He is best known for his work on the Bermuda Triangle: The Devil's Triangle (1974, Bantam Books), The Devil's Triangle 2 (Bantam Books 1975), and From The Devil's Triangle to The Devil's Jaw (Bantam Books 1977). He also completed a TV film documentary on the Devil's Triangle, narrated by Vincent Price and released in 1974.

Winer claimed that there were "mysterious" things going on in the Bermuda Triangle but denied any paranormal involvement. He stated that "all the answers lie in human error, mechanical malfunction, freak weather or magnetic anomalies."

Ghosts

Winer was a ghost hunter. He wrote several books about ghosts and haunted houses. His book Haunted Houses (1979) was co-authored with Nancy Osborn.

Publications
The Devil's Triangle (1974)
The Devil's Triangle 2 (1976)
From the Devil's Triangle to the Devil's Jaw (1977)
Haunted Houses (1979) [with Nancy Osborn]
More Haunted Houses (1981) [with Nancy Osborn Ishmael]
Houses of Horror (1983)
Ghost Ships (2000)

References

External links

The Devil's Triangle on the Internet Archive

1925 births
2016 deaths
American fortean writers
American non-fiction writers
Bermuda Triangle
Parapsychologists